The 1974 Tasman Series (formally the Tasman Championship for Drivers) was an international motor racing competition which commenced on 5 January and ended on 23 February 1974 after eight races. The championship, which was the eleventh Tasman Championship, was open to Racing cars complying with the Tasman Formula. The winner was awarded the Tasman Cup.

The championship was won by Peter Gethin of the United Kingdom, driving a Chevron B24 Chevrolet.

Schedule

The championship was contested over eight rounds with each round comprising a single race.

Points system
Championship points were awarded for race positions at each race on the following basis:

Points from all races were counted towards each driver's championship total.

Championship standings

References

1974
Tasman Series
Tasman Series
Formula 5000